London Hyde Park 1969 is the official video album by Blind Faith of their appearance at a free concert held in Hyde Park in London on 7 June 1969. It was released in the UK in 2005, and in the US and Canada in 2006. The concert was the band's debut performance and took place two months before the release of their debut album, Blind Faith in August 1969.

The DVD contains the band's 45-minute performance at the event, plus additional material, including interviews with Steve Winwood, Ginger Baker and Eric Clapton, and videos of the band members performing in some of their former groups, namely the Spencer Davis Group, Traffic, Family and Cream.

Reception

In a review for AllMusic, Bret Adams described London Hyde Park 1969 as an "excellent" recording of the concert. He found Clapton's electric guitar on "Can't Find My Way Home" "fascinating" because he played acoustic guitar on that song on Blind Faith. He was also impressed with Winwood's keyboard playing on "Do What You Like" and "Presence of the Lord". Adams noted that while the inclusion of several covers in Blind Faith's set highlights one of the band's weaknesses, namely "a lack of original, fully realized songs", he called the event "pivotal" in the history of rock music.

Writing in Clouds and Clocks, Beppe Colli noted how "ill-at-ease" Clapton appeared at times, but complimented Winwood and Baker's performances. He cited "Can't Find My Way Home" as the set's best piece and described the video album overall as "an absolutely indispensable document".

In a review in Vintage Rock, Shawn Perry had mixed feelings about the video. He described the band's performance as "listless" and "sub-par at best". He felt that while Clapton played "flawlessly", he appeared "indifferent" and seemed happy to let Winwood take the lead. Perry said "Can’t Find My Way Home", "Do What You Like" and in particular "Presence of the Lord" came across nicely, and summed up the DVD, saying, "Warts and all, it’s still a worthwhile souvenir from a pivotal period in rock and roll."

Track listing

Source: Discogs, DVD

Personnel
Blind Faith
Ginger Baker – drums
Eric Clapton – guitar 
Ric Grech – bass guitar
Steve Winwood – keyboards, vocals
Matthew Longfellow – editor
Ghizela Rowe – producer
Freddie Rowe – executive producer
Robert Stigwood – executive producer
Source: DVD credits

Footnotes

References

External links

2005 live albums
2005 video albums
Live video albums
Blind Faith albums